Vallvé is a Catalan surname. Notable people with the surname include:

Jaime Vallvé (1928–2000), Spanish comic strip artist
Rosa Francisca Dolors Molas Vallvé (1815–1876), Spanish Roman Catholic nun

Catalan-language surnames